Élisabeth Grousselle (born 6 February 1973) is a retired French middle-distance runner who specialized in the 800 metres.

Achievements

Personal bests
200 metres - 25.47 s (2002)
400 metres - 55.07 s (2002)
800 metres - 1:59.46 min (2004)

External links

1973 births
Living people
French female middle-distance runners
Athletes (track and field) at the 2004 Summer Olympics
Olympic athletes of France
Mediterranean Games silver medalists for France
Mediterranean Games medalists in athletics
Athletes (track and field) at the 2005 Mediterranean Games
21st-century French women